Rinorea squamata is a species of plant in the Violaceae family. It is found in Costa Rica, Honduras, Nicaragua, and Panama.

References

squamata
Near threatened plants
Taxonomy articles created by Polbot